15 till Midnight is a 2010 science fiction film directed by Wolfgang Meyer and written by Brandon Slagle, who also stars in the film. The film also stars Dee Martin and Devanny Pinn.

Plot
Lukas Reyes is trapped in a seemingly endless loop between parallel existences, one being occupied by his spouse, Sera, and another being occupied by a relation from another life, Nara. As worlds seem to begin colliding and further bleeding into one another, he finds himself pursued by a group of shadow-men known as "The Knowers". The common thread between everything being a significance with the time 11:45 - fifteen minutes until midnight.

Cast
Brandon Slagle as Lukas Reyes / Reverse Lukas
Dee Martin as Damon
Devanny Pinn as Nara
Andrew Roth as Sarosta
Andrea Chen as Sera
Olivia Baseman as The Cipher
Tony San Miguel as The Head Agent
Thomas Daniel as Neal

References

External links
 
 

2010 films
2010s English-language films
American science fiction films
2010s science fiction films
2010s American films